Zafar Ali Zafari (1930 – 2 April 2021) was a Pakistani field hockey player, coach, and military officer in Pakistan Army. 

He was a member of the Pakistan national hockey team which won the country's first-ever Olympic gold in 1960, but he did not play in the tournament.

He retired from military service in 1980 as lieutenant colonel. His son, Amir Zafar, is also a field hockey player.

References

Pakistani male field hockey players
Pakistan Army officers
1930 births
2021 deaths
Olympic field hockey players of Pakistan